The Provița is a left tributary of the river Cricovul Dulce in Romania. It discharges into the Cricovul Dulce in Vlădeni. It flows through the villages Ocina de Sus, Adunați, Ocina de Jos, Provița de Sus, Provița de Jos, Drăgăneasa, Măgureni, Filipeștii de Pădure and Dițești.

References

Rivers of Romania
Rivers of Prahova County
Rivers of Dâmbovița County